Bogurodzica (calque of the Greek term Theotokos), in English known as the Mother of God, is a medieval Roman Catholic hymn composed sometime between the 10th and 13th centuries in Poland. It is believed to be the oldest religious hymn or patriotic anthem in the Polish language, which was traditionally sung in Old Polish with the Greek phrase Kyrie eleison – "Lord, have mercy". While its origin is not entirely clear, several scholars agree that Saint Adalbert of Prague is the likely author. Polish knights chanted Bogurodzica prior to their engagement at the Battle of Grunwald and it also accompanied the coronation ceremonies of the first Jagiellonian kings.

History 

It was recorded in writing at the beginning of the 15th century. Two records preserved till today date back to that time: 
 the Kcynia record including two initial stanzas together with musical notation;
 the Kraków record covering thirteen stanzas without notes.
Other records date back to the second half of the fifteenth century, the turn of the fifteenth and sixteenth centuries and to the beginning of the 16th century. In 1509, the hymn was printed in Kraków and incorporated into the "Statutes of Bishop Jan Łaski".

The origin of the song is not clear, although Saint Adalbert is widely believed to be its author or contributor. It heavily reflected Latin and Christian liturgy as a whole. The two initial stanzas were created first - possibly in the middle or at the end of the thirteenth century, or possibly at the very beginning of the fourteenth century.

Bogurodzica is a prayer hymn whose first stanza contains an invocation to Christ through the intercession of Mary. It begins with an apostrophe to her - to the Mother of Christ, the Virgin, praised by God, the chosen one. After the apostrophe, there is an appeal to Mary to win favour for people from her Son.

The second stanza begins with a direct addresses to Christ (called God's Son) - with an invocation to John the Baptist who can support human imploring. The prayer closing this stanza contains a request that Christ give people a blissful stay on Earth and, after death, everlasting existence in heaven. The subsequent stanzas develop various motifs such as Easter, the Passion of Jesus and litany - with invocations to the saints.

Bogurodzica was initially associated with religious mass and procession, however, by the fifteenth century it became a war hymn and a battle cry. According to Jan Długosz, historian and author of Annales seu Cronicae incliti Regni Poloniae, Bogurodzica was sung at Grunwald in 1410 as well as before other notable battles in the subsequent years. It also accompanied the coronation of Władysław III of Poland. Długosz defined the tune as "carmen patrium" – 'the hymn of the fatherland'. In spite of this, the hymn lost its significance over the upcoming centuries to new patriotic anthems, notably "Rota" and "Poland Is Not Yet Lost".

Lyrics 
Old Polish 
 

 

English 
Virgin, Mother of God, God-famed Mary! 
Ask Thy Son, our Lord, God-named Mary, 
To have mercy upon us and hand it over to us! 
Kyrie eleison! 

Son of God, for Thy Baptist's sake, 
Hear the voices, fulfill the pleas we make! 
Listen to the prayer we say, 
For what we ask, give us today: 
Life on earth free of vice;  
After life: paradise!

Quotations in modern music 

 Andrzej Panufnik - Sinfonia sacra (1963)
 Wojciech Kilar - Bogurodzica for choir and orchestra (1975)
 Krzysztof Meyer - Symfony No. 6 "Polish" (1982)
 Chłopomania - Bogurodzica (from Ludomania) (2008)
 Anna Witczak Czerniawska & Maleo Reggae Rockers feat Mazzoll - Bogurodzica (2015),

See also 
 Gaude mater Polonia
 Hospodine, pomiluj ny

References

Bibliography 
 Bogurodzica. Oprac. J. Woronczak, wstęp językoznawczy E. Ostrowska, oprac. muzykologiczne H. Feicht, Wrocław 1962. Biblioteka Pisarzów Polskich.
 J.Birkenmajer, Bogurodzica Dziewica. Analiza tekstu, treści i formy, Lwów 1937.
 S.Urbańczyk, "Bogurodzica". Problemy czasu powstania i tła kulturalnego, w: Prace z dziejów języka polskiego, Wrocław 1979.
 A.Czyż, Bogurodzica - między Wschodem i Zachodem. Kilka myśli o duchowej jedności Europy, w: Światło i słowo. Egzystencjalne czytanie tekstów dawnych, Warszawa 1995.
 W. Wydra, Dlaczego pod Grunwaldem śpiewano "Bogurodzicę"? Trzy rozdziały o najdawniejszych polskich pieśniach religijnych, Poznań, Wydawnictwo Poznańskie Studia Polonistyczne, 2000.

External links 

Polish Literature in English Translation: "Bogurodzica"

National symbols of Poland
Polish Christian hymns
Polish patriotic songs
Old Polish literature
The Most Holy Virgin Mary, Queen of Poland
Marian hymns